Raja Hasan is an Indian playback singer who was born in December 1982 in the city of Bikaner, Rajasthan, India. He was a finalist on Sa Re Ga Ma Pa Challenge 2007, in which he finished as runner-up to Aneek Dhar. Recently he was a judge in the singing competition show "Voice of Shekhawati".

Early years
Raja Hasan comes from the desert city of Bikaner, Rajasthan. He considers his father, Rafik Sagar (singer and music composer) and his grandfather Allah Rakha Khan as his gurus in singing.

Raja Hasan was a runner-up in the reality TV show Sa Re Ga Ma Pa Challenge 2007 and winner of Ek Se Badhkar Ek on Zee TV,  Music Ka Maha Muqqabla on StarPlus, Ustaadon Ka Ustaad on Sony and, IPL Rockstar on the Colors channel. He also done guest appearances in many tv shows (fiction and non-fiction and reality shows). He and Arijit Singh Debuted Together in Aaja Nachle Song in High School Musical 2. His First Single Song was given by his Sa Re Ga Ma Pa Challenge 2007 Mentor Vishal–Shekhar in De Taali Song was Maari Teetri

Playback singing
He has many songs that he has recorded for Bollywood films.
 Mridang - An Unexpected Journey: "Title track" mridang baaje jab kismat ka
 Gurjar Aandolan: "Gurjar Aandolan sare aam karenge"
Dostana:"Khabar Nahi"
 De Taali: "Maari Teetri"
 Jai Veeru: "Dhun Lagi" and "Agre Ka Ghagra"
 99: "Delhi Destiny"
 Tees Maar Khan: "Wallah Re Wallah"
 Sadiyaan: "Sargoshiyo"
 No One Killed Jessica: "Aali Re"
 Well Done Abba: "Rahiman Ishq Ka Dhaga Re" and "Pani Ko Taraste"
 A Flat: "Chal Halke" and "Dil Kashi"
 Me Mamu and 7: "Billo Rani"
 Bachna Ae Haseeno: "Lucky Boy"
 MadhoLal-Keep Walking: "MadhoLal-Keep Walking"
 Chalo Dilli: "Chalo Dilli"
 Dreamz unlimited/Kaala khatta: "Maula"
 Ishq: "Chinnadana Neekosam"
 High School Musical 2: "Varri Varri"
 Shanghai: "Khuadaaya" and "Morcha"
 Teree Sang: "Tere Bin"
 Pyaar Ka Punchnama 2: "Sharabi"
 Shubh Mangal Savdhan: "Kankad"
 JD: "Naya Safar"
Ram Ratan: "Nagada Nagada"
 Mitron: "Sanedo"
 Loveyatri: "Rangtaari" and "Dholida"
 Kanudo: "Thane Raat Din" and "Ghunghat me Na Chand"
 Kathor: "Antar Man Ki kalah"
My friend ganesha 2: "Yaara Ruth Gaya"
Bhuj: The Pride of India: "Zaalima Coca Cola"
 The Pushkar Lodge: "Padharo Rajasthan"
Ebn-E-Batuta: Ishq Ka Sutta
Time to Dance: Hathon Se Yoon
Chahat Ya Nasha: Fanah Kar
 Jabariya Jodi:Jilla Hillela (2019)
Mission Mangal: Tota Udd (2019)
 Vande Mataram Song (2019)
Mere Angne Mein (2020)

Gujarati Movie 
Satti Par Satto: Saathi and Bol Bilaadi Bol (2018)

Odia Movie
Daha Balunga
Lekhi Chi Na Tara

Telugu movies
 Pula Rangadu
 Ishq
 Chinnadana Nee Kosam
Loukyam
Bhimavaram Bullodu

Bengali movies
 Buno Haansh

Rajasthani movies
 Vishesh

Bhojpuri movies
 EE Kaisan Bidaai: "E Kaisan Bidaai"

Album 
 Yaar Mila De Re
 Mere Angne Mein 
 Dil Janiya  
 Gota Hi Gota  
 Gallan Mahiya Diyan  
 Deewana  
 Hayo Rabba  
 Welcome To Haryana Ji  
 Khoto Sikko  
 Banna Jad Chaale  
 Tharo Bhai  
 Raj Banna Sa  
 Khoon Di Fitrat  
 Holi Ka Rang  
 Udta Teer  
 Bewafa Hum Na The

As Actor 
He Played a side roll in Rajma Chawal Movie. The Character Name Is Jacky Jam.

As producer
He Produced His First Rajasthani Film Marudhar Mharo Ghar also He Act in The Movie as A Lead.

Accolades

References

External links
Follow Him On
 Instagram
Facebook
Twitter
Facebook Page

1981 births
Indian Muslims
Rajasthani people
Living people
Bollywood playback singers
People from Bikaner
Sa Re Ga Ma Pa participants